Single Action is an album by saxophonist Willis Jackson with guitarist Pat Martino which was recorded in 1978 and first released on the Muse label.

Reception 

In his review on Allmusic, Scott Yanow notes that "Single Action does give one a good example of Jackson playing in a tenor style that (other than Houston Person and now Joshua Redman) is quickly disappearing."

Track listing 
All compositions by Willis Jackson except where noted.
 "Evergreen" (Barbra Streisand, Paul Williams) – 4:44
 "Bolita" – 8:12
 "Makin' Whoopee" (Walter Donaldson, Gus Kahn) – 6:59
 "You Are the Sunshine of My Life" (Stevie Wonder) – 7:43
 "Hittin' the Numbers" – 5:01
 "Single Action" – 6:17
 "Evergreen" [Alternate Take] (Streisand, Williams) – 4:41 Bonus track on CD reissue

Personnel 
Willis Jackson – tenor saxophone
Pat Martino – guitar
Carl Wilson – organ
Jimmy Lewis – bass
Yusef Ali – drums
Buddy Caldwell – congas

References 

Willis Jackson (saxophonist) albums
Pat Martino albums
1978 albums
Muse Records albums
Albums recorded at Van Gelder Studio